Edwart Ewart (2 August 1860 – 26 April 1935) was a Scotland international rugby union player.

Rugby Union career

Amateur career

He played for Glasgow Academicals. He left Scotland in 1884 to go the United States after his mother died in 1883. He joined his older brother who had set up a farm in  Oregon.

Provincial career

He played for Glasgow District in their inter-city match against Edinburgh District on 1 December 1877.

He played for Blues Trial in their match against Whites Trial on 16 February 1878. This trial match was to try and impress the Scotland international side selectors.

He played for West of Scotland District in their match against East of Scotland District on 1 March 1879.

International career

He was capped three times for Scotland between 1879 and 1880 spanning the 1879 Home Nations Championship and the 1880 Home Nations Championship.

References

1860 births
1935 deaths
Scottish rugby union players
Scotland international rugby union players
Rugby union players from Moffat
Glasgow Academicals rugby union players
West of Scotland District (rugby union) players
Glasgow District (rugby union) players
Blues Trial players
Rugby union forwards